Frank Drohan (13 August 1879 – 5 March 1953) was an Irish politician.  He was elected unopposed at the 1921 elections for the Waterford–Tipperary East constituency as a Sinn Féin Teachta Dála (TD) in the 2nd Dáil.

He was personally opposed to the Anglo-Irish Treaty signed on 6 December 1921, but the local Sinn Féin branch instructed him to vote in favour; he felt the only honourable course was to submit his resignation, which was read out by the Ceann Comhairle Eoin MacNeill on 5 January 1922, two days before the Dáil voted to accept the Treaty.

Frank Drohan Road is the section of the N24 serving as an inner relief road outside Clonmel.

References

1879 births
1953 deaths
Early Sinn Féin TDs
Members of the 2nd Dáil